Hattingley is a small hamlet in the East Hampshire district of Hampshire, England.

Geography

History
It was once in the large civil parish of neighbouring Bentworth, however it is now situated in Medstead.

The nearest railway station is the restored Medstead & Four Marks station on the Watercress Line, trains from which connect with the nearest national rail station  to the northeast, at Alton.

Villages in Hampshire